The Willow Tree is a surviving 1920 American silent film directed by Henry Otto and distributed by Metro Pictures. The film is based on a Broadway play, The Willow Tree, by J. H. Benrimo and Harrison Rhodes. Fay Bainter starred in the Broadway play in 1917. The film stars Viola Dana and is preserved in the George Eastman House Motion Picture Collection.

Plot
As described in a film magazine, O-Riu (Dana), daughter of a Japanese image-maker, rebels at his command that she marry a wealthy merchant in order to provide funds for her brother to attend an American college. Due to a coincidence, her flight is misinterpreted as a suicide, and her father sells to an Englishman living in the neighborhood his most prized image. Seeking refuge, O-Riu poses as the image and then "comes to life" apparently by magic. The Englishman falls in love with her and will not answer his country's call to arms until she has apparently disappeared. While he is away for four years, she lives at his home. When he returns after the war, they find happiness. The film has a parallel story concerning Japanese legends.

Cast
Viola Dana as O-Riu
Edward Connelly as Tomotada
Pell Trenton as Ned Hamilton
Harry Dunkinson as Jeoffrey Fuller
Alice Wilson as Mary Fuller
Frank Tokunaga as John Charles Goto
Togo Yamamoto as Itomudo
George Kuwa as Kimura
Tom Ricketts as Priest

References

External links

1920 films
Films directed by Henry Otto
American films based on plays
American silent feature films
1920 drama films
Silent American drama films
American black-and-white films
Metro Pictures films
Surviving American silent films
1920s American films